Ernesto Tagliaferri (1889 in Naples – 1937 in Naples), was an Italian musician and composer of Neapolitan songs. His songs are world famous and have been recorded by many singers.

Biography
Born in Naples on 18 November 1889, the father was a barber with his "Salon" in Via S. Antonio Abate in Naples. He graduated in violin and composition at the Conservatory S. Pietro a Maiella of Naples. He began his career directing main companies in the Eden and La Fenice theatres in Naples. During the First World War starts an orchestra giving concerts for the troops and composing patriotic songs like "Italia mia". In 1926 starts the musical publishing house La bottega dei Quattro (The Workshop of the Four) with the authors Bovio, Lama and Valente. He settled down in Torre del Greco with his wife Lucia D'Orlando, sister-in-law of tenor Francesco Albanese. He died suddenly the 6 March 1937 aged 48. The poet Libero Bovio expressed the funeral oration in the plaza of Torre del Greco.

Famous songs
 Nun me scetà
 Italia mia
 Napule canta
 Napule ca se ne va
 Pusilleco
 Mandulinata a Napule
 Quì fu Napoli
 Piscatore e Pusilleco
 Quanno ammore vo' filà
 'O cunto 'e Mariarosa
 Passione

External links 

Italian musicians
1889 births
1937 deaths